Sisne  is a village development committee in Eastern Rukum District in Lumbini Province of western Nepal. At the time of the 2011 Nepal census it had a population of 1877 people living in 372 individual households.

References

Populated places in Eastern Rukum District